Shahid Chamran may refer to:
 Shahid Chamran, Khuzestan
 Shahid Chamran, Lorestan
 Shahid Chamran, Sistan and Baluchestan
 Shahid Chamran University of Ahvaz, in Khuzestan Province
 Mostafa Chamran, Iranian physicist and politician